Durry may refer to:

Dhurrie, a type of flat-woven rug in India and Pakistan
Ann Marie Doory, an American politician
Durrie Station, a pastoral lease in Queensland, Australia.
Durry, a New Zealand or Australian slang term for cigarette